Poland competed at the 2012 Summer Paralympics in London, United Kingdom, from 29 August to 9 September 2012.

Medallists

Archery

Men

|-
|align=left|Marek Kantczak
|align=left|Men's individual compound open
|653
|10
|W 6-0
|L 0-6
|colspan=4|did not advance
|-
|align=left|Wiktor Patryas
|align=left|Men's individual recurve standing
|596
|14
|L 2-6
|colspan=5|did not advance
|-
|align=left|Piotr Sawicki
|align=left|Men's individual recurve W1/W2
|600
|8
|
|L 4-6
|colspan=4|did not advance
|}

Women

|-
|align=left|Milena Olszewska
|align=left rowspan=2|Women's individual recurve standing
|580
|2
|
|W 7-1
|W 6-4
|L 2-6
|W 6-2
|
|-
|align=left|Grazyna Wojciechowska
|477
|16
|L 2-6
|colspan=5|did not advance
|}

Athletics

Men's track

Men's field

Women's track

Women's field

Cycling

Road

Track

Powerlifting

Men

Women

Rowing

Shooting

Swimming

Men

Women

Table tennis

Men

Women

Teams

Wheelchair basketball

Men's tournament

Poland qualified for the men's team event in wheelchair basketball by finishing sixth at the 2010 Wheelchair Basketball World Championship. Competing athletes are given eight-level classification points specific to wheelchair basketball, ranging from 0.5 to 4.5 with lower points representing a higher degree of disability. The total points of all players on the court cannot exceed 14.

Group B

Quarter-final

5th–8th place semi-final

7th/8th place match

Wheelchair fencing

Men

Women

Wheelchair tennis

See also
Poland at the Paralympics
Poland at the 2012 Summer Olympics

Notes

Nations at the 2012 Summer Paralympics
2012
Summer Paralympics